The 2004 Governor General's Awards for Literary Merit: Finalists in 14 categories (68 books) were announced October 26, the four children's literature winners announced and presented November 15, other winners announced and presented November 16. The prize for writers and illustrators was $15,000 and "a specially crafted copy of the winning book bound by master bookbinder Pierre Ouvrard".

As introduced in 2003, the four children's literature awards were announced and presented separately from the others. The event at Rideau Hall, the Governor General's residence in Ottawa, was scheduled to begin at 10:00 on a Monday morning. "Children from across the National Capital Region will be invited to attend the event, which will also include readings and workshops related to children's literature.

English

French

References

Governor General's Awards
Governor General's Awards
Governor General's Awards